Presidential elections were held in Benin in March 1991, the first direct presidential elections since 1970. Elections under the military regime of Mathieu Kérékou had been indirect, with the president chosen by the National Assembly.

The first round, held on 10 March, saw no candidate receive more than 37% of the vote.  Prime Minister Nicéphore Soglo led the field, with Kérékou in second place.  The second round on 24 March resulted in a decisive victory for Soglo, with almost two-thirds of the vote. Voter turnout was 56% in the first round and 64% in the second.

The elections marked the first instance in post-colonial Francophone Africa that an opposition candidate won a free election.

Results

References

Presidential elections in Benin
Benin
Presidential